Abdoulaye Diop (born 17 September 1999) is a Senegalese footballer who plays for Detroit City in the USL Championship.

Career

Early career
Diop played soccer at the Montverde Academy and spent a season with the Orlando City SC academy during their 2017-18 season.

Eastern Florida State College
Diop played one season of college soccer at Eastern Florida State College in 2019, where he scored 4 goals and tallied 4 assists in 17 appearances.

Detroit City FC
While at college, Diop also appeared for NPSL side Detroit City, making 12 regular season appearances, scoring 1 goal in a season where they won the Great Lakes Conference and progressed to the Regional Finals.

Atlanta United 2
On 26 February 2020, it was announced that Diop would sign for USL Championship side Atlanta United 2. He made his debut for Atlanta on 11 July 2020, appearing as a 58th-minute substitute in a 2-1 loss against Tampa Bay Rowdies. Diop was released by Atlanta following the 2021 season.

Detroit City FC
On 12 January 2022, Diop returned to Detroit City ahead of their inaugural USL Championship season.

Personal
Born in Dakar, Senegal, Diop moved to Florida in the United States when he was 13 years old.

References

1999 births
Living people
Senegalese footballers
Senegalese expatriate footballers
Expatriate soccer players in the United States
Senegalese expatriate sportspeople in the United States
Soccer players from Florida
Association football midfielders
Montverde Academy alumni
EFSC Titans men's soccer players
Detroit City FC players
Atlanta United 2 players
National Premier Soccer League players
USL Championship players